West Main Street Historic District is a national historic district located at Forest City, Rutherford County, North Carolina.  It encompasses 27 contributing buildings, 1 contributing site, and 1 contributing object in a predominantly residential section of Forest City.  The district developed after 1867, and includes notable examples of Colonial Revival and Bungalow / American Craftsman style architecture. Located in the district is the separately listed Cool Springs High School designed by Louis H. Asbury (1877-1975). Other notable contributing resources include the Cool Springs Cemetery (est. 1867), First Presbyterian Church (1940), the Cool Springs Gymnasium (1958), Lovelace-Ragin House (1928), Harrill-Wilkins House (1925), Frank B. and Mae Bridges Wilkins House (c. 1910), McDaniel House (1913), Biggerstaff-Griffin House (1925), and McMurry-Bodie House (1928).

It was added to the National Register of Historic Places in 2006.

Gallery

References

Forest City, North Carolina
Historic districts on the National Register of Historic Places in North Carolina
Colonial Revival architecture in North Carolina
Buildings and structures in Rutherford County, North Carolina
National Register of Historic Places in Rutherford County, North Carolina